Makhzoumi is a surname. Notable people with the surname include:

Fouad Makhzoumi (born 1952), UK-based Lebanese businessman and politician
Ziad Makhzoumi (born 1955), Lebanese-British businessman